Muhammad Dimas Drajad (born 30 March 1997, Gresik) is an Indonesian professional footballer who plays as a forward for Liga 1 club Persikabo 1973 and the Indonesia national team. He is also a Second Sergeant in the Indonesian Army. He has youngest brother who also a footballer Ahmad Wahyudi.

International career 
Dimas began his first career in the national team when trained by Indra Sjafri, then, Indonesia has become a champion in 2013 AFF U-19 Youth Championship. In 2014, Dimas represented the Indonesia U-19, in the 2014 AFC U-19 Championship.

On 1 June 2022, Dimas earned his first senior cap in a friendly match against Bangladesh that ended 0–0. On 14 March 2022, Dimas scored his first international goal for Indonesia, in a 7–0 win against Nepal in the third round of Asian Cup qualifiers.

On 24 September 2022, Dimas scored a goal in a friendly match against Curaçao in a 3–2 win. A few days later on 27 September 2022, Dimas scored the opening goal for the friendly match against Curaçao which resulted in a 2–1 win.

In November 2022, it was reported that Dimas received a call-up from the Indonesia for a training camp, in preparation for the 2022 AFF Championship.

Career statistics

Club

International

International goals
International under-23 goals

International senior goals

Honours

International
Indonesia U-19
 AFF U-19 Youth Championship: 2013
Indonesia U-22
 AFF U-22 Youth Championship: 2019

Club
PS TNI U-21
 Indonesia Soccer Championship U-21: 2016
PSMS Medan
 Liga 2 runner-up: 2017

Individual
 Indonesia Soccer Championship U-21 Best Player: 2016
 Liga 1 Goal of the Month: September 2022

References

External links 

 
 Dimas Drajad at Liga Indonesia

Indonesian footballers
1997 births
Living people
Sportspeople from East Java
People from Gresik Regency
Persegres Gresik players
Gresik United players
PSMS Medan players
Persikabo 1973 players
Liga 1 (Indonesia) players
Liga 2 (Indonesia) players
Indonesia youth international footballers
Indonesia international footballers
Association football forwards